Dobreşti may refer to:

Dobrești, Argeș, a commune in Argeș County, Romania
Dobrești, Bihor, a commune in Bihor County, Romania
Dobrești, Dolj, a commune in Dolj County, Romania
Dobrești, a village in Gârda de Sus Commune, Alba County, Romania
Dobrești, a village in Moroeni Commune, Dâmbovița County, Romania
Dobrești, a village in Bara Commune, Timiș County, Romania
Dobrești, a village in Dănicei Commune, Vâlcea County, Romania

See also 
 Dobre (disambiguation)
 Dobra (disambiguation)
 Dobrin (disambiguation)
 Dobrușa (disambiguation)
 Dobrotești (disambiguation)
 Dobrescu (surname)